Walter William Stude (December 3, 1913 in Kingston, Ontario – October 25, 1991) was an American field hockey player. He played at the 1948, 1952, and 1956 Summer Olympics. He was born in Canada, but moved as a child to Catonsville, Maryland.

References

External links
 

Canadian male field hockey players
American male field hockey players
Sportspeople from Kingston, Ontario
1913 births
1991 deaths
Olympic field hockey players of the United States
Field hockey players at the 1948 Summer Olympics
Field hockey players at the 1956 Summer Olympics
Canadian emigrants to the United States